A corps in the Australian Army is an administrative group that comprises members with similar work functions

Corps

Current 
The following is a list of the 23 Corps of the Australian Army, ordered according to the traditional seniority of all the Corps.

Corps of Staff Cadets
Royal Australian Armoured Corps
Royal Australian Artillery
Royal Australian Engineers
Royal Australian Corps of Signals
Royal Australian Infantry Corps
Australian Army Aviation Corps
Australian Intelligence Corps
Royal Australian Army Chaplains Department
Royal Australian Corps of Transport
Royal Australian Army Medical Corps
Royal Australian Army Dental Corps
Royal Australian Army Ordnance Corps
Royal Australian Electrical and Mechanical Engineers
Royal Australian Army Educational Corps
Australian Army Public Relations Service
Australian Army Catering Corps
Royal Australian Army Pay Corps
Australian Army Legal Corps
Royal Australian Corps of Military Police
Australian Army Psychology Corps
Australian Army Band Corps
Royal Australian Army Nursing Corps

Disbanded 
Women's Royal Australian Army Corps
Royal Australian Survey Corps
Royal Australian Army Service Corps
Australian Instructional Corps
Australian Staff Corps
Australian Army Veterinary Corps
Australian Machine Gun Corps
Australian Mining Corps

References

See also 
 Structure of the Australian Army
 List of Australian Army regiments
 List of Australian military bases

Army